is a 2013 Japanese drama film directed by Azuma Morisaki and based on a manga by Yuichi Okano. It was released in Japan on November 16.

Cast
 Harue Akagi as Mitsue Okano
 Ryo Iwamatsu as Yuichi Okano
 Kiwako Harada as Young Mitsue Okano
 Ryo Kase as Satoru Okano
 Kensuke Owada as Masaki Okano
 Tomoyo Harada as Chieko
 Naoto Takenaka as Honda
 Mitsuko Baisho as Matsu
 Yoichi Nukumizu as Cafe owner
 Ryudo Uzaki as Conductor
 Wakana Matsumoto as Nursing home staff
 Nao Nagasawa as Nursing home staff

Reception

Accolades
It was chosen as the best Japanese film of 2013 by the film magazines Eiga Geijutsu and Kinema Junpo.

References

External links

2013 films
2013 drama films
Live-action films based on manga
Films directed by Azuma Morisaki
Best Film Kinema Junpo Award winners
Japanese drama films
2010s Japanese films